Count Manfred von Clary-Aldringen (30 May 1852 Palais Mollard-Clary, Vienna12 February 1928 Castle Herrnau, Salzburg) was an Austro-Hungarian nobleman and statesman. He served as the 16th Minister-President of Cisleithania (therefore the 28th Minister-President of Austria overall).

Biography

Family 
Born into a prominent Austro-Hungarian princely family of Bohemian origin (the Clary-Aldringens), the son of Fürst (prince) Edmund Moritz and Fürstin (princess) Elisabeth-Alexandrine von Clary-und-Aldringen, (born countess de Ficquelmont). He is the younger brother of Fürst (prince) Siegfried (1848–1929) who was a prominent Austro-Hungarian diplomat and the grandson of count Charles-Louis de Ficquelmont (1777–1857), 2nd Minister-President of the Austrian Empire.

In 1884, he married in Vienna Gräfin (countess) Franziska Pejácsevich von Veröcze, heiress of one of the most powerful family of the Croatian descending from the princes Esterházy von Galántha. The couple had two children.

Political career 
Count Clary-und-Aldringen studied Law at the University of Vienna before starting a political career in Imperial Austria. 
The Austro-Hungarian Empire was dominated by a small circle of high nobility families that had great power and enormous riches and thus played a major role in politics and diplomacy. Count Manfred is the perfect example of such an influence.

On February 22, 1896, he became Governor of the Länder of Austrian-Silesia, a key office in a strategic region for the Empire: not only was the länder rich in natural resources but it also lay at the border with both German and Russian Empires. Austrian-Silesia was heir to a long power struggle between these three empires and at the heart of the nationalistic issues of central European irredentisms.

In 1898, Count Manfred became Governor and representative at the Imperial Austrian Reischrat (Imperial Austrian Council) for the Länder of Styria, an office of major importance he kept until the fall of the Empire in 1918. Styria was one of the powerhouses of the Austro-Hungarian economy, the länder was a center of industries and agricultures, and its capital Graz was one of the Empire's most populous cities.

From October 2 to December 21, 1899, Count Clary-und-Aldringen served as Minister-President of Austria, following in the steps of his grandfather, Count Charles-Louis de Ficquelmont (1777–1857) who succeeded Prince Metternich as the second Minister-President of the Empire in 1848.

Later life 

After the fall of the Austro-Hungarian Empire following the defeat of the Central Powers during the autumn of 1918, Count Manfred resigned from all his official offices and spent his remaining years between his estates in Austria and his family's Czech estates (Teplice).

On February 12, 1928 count Manfred von Clary-und-Aldringen died in his Salzburg residence of Schoss Herrnau (Herrnau Castle).

Count Clary und Aldringen is widely seen as a modernizer and has been regarded as both one of the most prominent statesman of the end of the Austro-Hungarian Empire and a symbol of the influence of the Austro-Hungarian high nobility in politics at the turn of the 19th century.

He has also been well known for successfully fighting Tuberculosis when he was President of the Austrian Red Cross in Kronland.

Honours
 :
 Knight of the Order of Franz Joseph, 1890
 Knight of the Iron Crown, 1st Class, 1905
 Grand Cross of the Imperial Order of Leopold, 1915
 War Cross for Civil Merits, 1st Class
 Merit Star of the Decoration for Services to the Red Cross, with War Decoration
 Jubilee Cross for Civil State Officials
 Bronze Jubilee Medal for the Armed Forces
 Jubilee Medal for Civil State Officials
 : Knight of the Order of Charles III

See also
 The House of Clary-Aldringen
 Minister-President of Austria

Notes

Bibliography
 
 : Badeni – Thun – Clary-Aldringen – Eulenburg. Das österreichische Regierungssystem in der Krise der Jahre 1897–1899. In: Gernot Peter Obersteiner (Hrsg.): Festschrift Gerhard Pferschy zum 70. Geburtstag. Historische Landeskommission für Steiermark, Graz 2000, S. 327–349.
 : Manfred Graf Clary und Aldringen. Der letzte k. k. Statthalter in Steiermark. Sein Leben und Wirken. Graz 1952

External links 
  Ottův slovník naučný
  Ottův slovník naučný nové doby

1852 births
1928 deaths
19th-century Ministers-President of Austria
19th-century Austrian people
Ministers-President of Austria
Bohemian nobility
Austrian people of German Bohemian descent
Austrian people of Russian descent
Politicians from Vienna
Manfred
University of Vienna alumni
Knights of the Order of Franz Joseph